The R561 road is a regional road in Ireland. It is on the Dingle Peninsula in County Kerry. Part of the road is on the Wild Atlantic Way.

The beach dunes have yielded archaeological remains of ancient dwelling sites.

The R561 travels west from the N22 at Farranfore. The road joins the N70 from Brackhill to Castlemaine. The R561 continues west from Castlemaine along the north shore of Castlemaine Harbour to Inch and Inch Beach. The road then travels along the north shore of Dingle Bay before joining the N86 near Annascaul.

References

Regional roads in the Republic of Ireland
Roads in County Kerry